Teracotona murtafaa is a moth in the  family Erebidae. It was described by Wiltshire in 1980. It is found in Oman.

References

External links
Natural History Museum Lepidoptera generic names catalog

Moths described in 1980
Spilosomina